The third series of British talent competition programme Britain's Got Talent was broadcast on ITV, from 11 April to 30 May 2009. The judging panel of Simon Cowell, Amanda Holden and Piers Morgan returned from the previous series; a fourth judge, Kelly Brook, was added, but removed from the series shortly after filming began.

The third series was won by street dance troupe Diversity and finishing in first place and singer Susan Boyle finishing in second place. During its broadcast, the series averaged around 13.3 million viewers, with the figures partly helped by the notable performances of Boyle during her time in on the show, with her audition on the third series considered one of the most famous moments in the programme's history. The programme faced criticism during the third series for airing an unsuitable performance conducted in an audition, while Boyle's well-being became a major concern for producers following the final.

Series overview

Following open auditions held the previous year, the Judges' auditions took place across January and February 2009, within Manchester, Glasgow, Birmingham, London and Cardiff. Prior to the auditions, Kelly Brook was announced as a permanent fourth judge. However, after six days of filming the Manchester auditions Brook was removed from the series. She was credited as a guest judge when her appearance was broadcast.

The third series proved popular amongst viewers for the performances of Susan Boyle, whom deemed her their favourite amongst the participants despite becoming the runner-up in the competition. Her performances made her internationally famous, launching her career as a singer, with her  audition performance, involving her rendition of "I Dreamed a Dream" from the musical Les Misérables, being later posted to YouTube and earning around 100 million views within five days of its posting.

Of the participants that took part, only forty made it past this stage and into the five live semi-finals, with eight appearing in each one, and ten of these acts making it into the live final. The following below lists the results of each participant's overall performance in this series:

 |  |  | 

  Ages denoted for a participant(s), pertain to their final performance for this series.
  The latter value pertains to the age of the dog, as disclosed by its owner.

Semi-final summary
 Buzzed out |  Judges' vote | 
 |  |

Semi-final 1 (24 May)

Semi-final 2 (25 May)

Semi-final 3 (26 May)

Semi-final 4 (28 May)

Semi-final 5 (29 May)

Final (30 May)

 |

Ratings

Criticism & incidents
The third series saw Britain's Got Talent face criticism for the involvement of burlesque dancer Fabia Cerra. The primary concern of the complaints that were raised were over the unsuitable nature of her performance being shown on a programme aimed at a family audience. Although Ofcom investigated the matter, ITV argued in their defence that production staff had done their utmost to edit all footage to censor all inappropriate scenes of her audition, making use of editing to avoid showing anything that would breach the regulator's broadcasting codes.

However, the involvement of Susan Boyle required greater attention from the programme's staff, most particularly in the live rounds as she grew in fame with her performances. Media attention on Boyle that brought forth a number of questionable claims, forced the finalist to check into the Priory psychiatric clinic in London to recover, leaving producers the task of ensuring she had privacy from the continual media intrusion into her private life. The increasing amount of attention from the general public, over her care and well being, led to the producers asking for assistance from the Press Complaints Commission, who issued instructions to press editors to adhere firmly to the code of press conduct in regards to its rules on privacy - this included not allowing unauthorised photography to take place and respecting Boyle's entitlement to privacy while she recovered from her involvement in the programme.

References

2009 British television seasons
Britain's Got Talent